Thomas or Tom Devine may refer to:
 Sir Tom Devine (born 1945), Scottish historian
 Tom Devine (lawyer) (born 1951), American lawyer, lobbyist, and advocate for whistleblower rights
 Tad Devine (Thomas A. Devine, born 1955), American political consultant
 Tom Devine (hurler) (born 1995), Irish hurler